Hallenbeck Hill is a mountain in Greene County, New York. It is located in the Catskill Mountains southeast of West Athens. Potic Mountain is located west-northwest, Kykuit is located southwest, and Flint Mine Hill is located north of Hallenbeck Hill.

References

Mountains of Greene County, New York
Mountains of New York (state)